Ján Golian (26 January 1906, Dombóvár, Hungary – 1945, Flossenbürg concentration camp, Germany) was a Slovak Brigade General who became famous as one of the main organizers and the commander of the resistance 1st Czechoslovak Army in Slovakia during the Slovak National Uprising.

Biography 
He was born on 26 January 1906 in Dombóvár in today's territory of Hungary. His parents were native Slovaks who came from Šurany. 
He studied at the Military Academy in Hranice, in 1927 received the rank of lieutenant of artillery. In 1937 he received the rank of captain. He served as a staff officer in Trenčín. Belonged to a group of an anti-Nazi oriented officers. Since January 1944 he was appointed chief of staff of the Slovak Ground Forces in Banská Bystrica, where he gathered a group of influential anti-Nazi oriented officers sustaining contact with the Czechoslovak government-in-exile in London.

He was the supreme military leader of the uprising from 27 April 1944 (while the uprising was still in preparation) until the arrival of Division General Rudolf Viest on 7 October 1944. After the start of the Slovak National Uprising on 29 August 1944 Golian took command of the Slovak forces in central Slovakia, from the headquarters in Banská Bystrica. His units should serve only as a support for two Slovak divisions in eastern Slovakia which should secure connection with Soviet Red Army. However, organization of the resistance army in the eastern Slovakia failed and German forces disarmed both Slovak divisions without resistance. From the beginning of September Golian along with his staff organized the defence of the Slovak units encircled in central Slovakia. According to the testimony of his Chief of staff Major Július Nosko, Golian assumed that the resistance defence against the German attacks could not last more than 14 days. On 7 October 1944 Golian was replaced in command of the resistance army forces by general Viest. Afterwards, General Ján Golian served as Viest's deputy. Despite fierce fighting, the outnumbered and surrounded resistance army could not resist the well-equipped and better trained German forces. When Viest and Golian ordered their remaining units to start a guerrilla war on 27 October 1944, they did not know that it would be the last order they issued. Both Generals were captured by German special forces on 3 November 1944 in Pohronský Bukovec. He was detained in the Flossenbürg concentration camp, but all information about what happened to him in the last days of the war vanished. It is believed that he was tortured and then murdered in Flossenbürg together with General Viest. Golian was officially listed as missing for 2 years after the war.

See also 
List of people who disappeared

References 

1906 births
1940s missing person cases
1945 deaths
Czechoslovak military personnel killed in World War II
People from Dombóvár
Czechoslovak soldiers
Slovak people of World War II
Slovak military personnel of World War II
Slovak National Uprising
People who died in Flossenbürg concentration camp
Executed Czechoslovak people
Czechoslovak prisoners of war
Military personnel who died in Nazi concentration camps
Missing in action of World War II
Executed military leaders
Recipients of the Milan Rastislav Stefanik Order
Slovak people executed by Nazi Germany